This is a list of products developed by Realme.

Home and other Technology
Realme offered different varieties, from air purifier, headphone, smartwatch to TV's.

• Laptops
- Realme launched its first ever laptop named realme Book Slim, alongside realme GT Master Edition.

• Realme TechLife
- Realme also has various products that suites people's lifestyle, including beard removal, electric toothbrush, air conditioner, smartwatch, tripod, powerbank, bluetooth speaker, earbuds, hair dryer, tablet, vacuum cleaner, camera and smart scale.

Smartphones

Realme series

Realme GT series

Realme C series

Realme Narzo series

Realme X series

Realme Q series

Realme U series

PADs

Realme Pad series

TVs

Realme Smart TV Full HD (32") 
Realme Smart TV Full HD 32-inch comes with an ultra-bright FHD display with an ultra-wide gamut of up to 85% NTSC. With bezels as thin as 8.7mm, the Realme Smart TV Full HD promises an immersive viewing experience. For sound, the Realme Smart TV Full HD comes with 24W Quad Stereo Speakers with Dolby Atmos support and is powered by a MediaTek 64-bit Quad-core Processor. The smart TV comes with an all-in-one smart remote, multiple connectivity support including multiple ports.  The Realme Smart TV Full HD runs on Android 9 and it comes with Prime Video, Netflix, YouTube, Live TV and Google Play pre-loaded.

Realme Smart TV 4K (43'' & 50'') 
The TV is quite simple, with slim borders, adding to its minimalistic look. The TV boasts of Dolby Vision HDR and Dolby Atmos sound — making it the key features of this device. It offers Ultra-HD (3840 x 2160 pixel) resolution and supports various HDR formats including HDR10 and HDR10+.

The Realme Smart TV 4K runs on Android TV 10 and offers a stock Android TV launcher, keeping it fuss-free and easy to use. You get a couple of pre-installed OTT apps and others can be downloaded from the Google Play Store.

Powering the TV is a MediaTek quad-core processor.

Realme Smart TV SLED 4K (55") 
The Realme Smart TV SLED offers Ultra-HD (3840 x 2160 pixel) resolution and supports various HDR formats including HDR10 and HDR10+ with a screen size of 55 inches.

It has 4 speakers of 6W each, thus providing a total audio output of 24W.

References 

Android (operating system) devices
Lists of mobile phones
Realme